Revived Remixed Revisited is  a compilation album and first remix album by American country music singer Reba McEntire. The album was released on October 8, 2021, by MCA Nashville. The album consists of three discs: Revived features ten re-recordings made with McEntire's touring band, Remixed contains ten remixes, and Revisited features ten stripped back re-recordings produced by Dave Cobb. The set was preceded by the releases of several promotional singles, and a new version of "Does He Love You" with Dolly Parton was issued to country radio as the lead-off single and charted in the top 50 of the Billboard Hot Country Songs and Country Airplay charts.

Track listing

Charts

References

2021 albums
MCA Records albums
Universal Music Group albums
Reba McEntire albums
Albums produced by Tony Brown (record producer)
Albums produced by Dave Cobb